The Muhlenberg family created a United States political, religious, and military dynasty that was primarily based in the Commonwealth of Pennsylvania, but which had also expanded into the State of Ohio by the early nineteenth century. The German American family descends from Heinrich Melchior Mühlenberg/Henry Muhlenberg (1711–1787), a German immigrant, noted Lutheran minister, and founder of the Lutheran Church in America.

Noted members of the Muhlenberg family include:
Peter Muhlenberg (1746–1807) minister, Continental Army general, US congressman, US senator
Frederick Augustus Muhlenberg:
Frederick Augustus Muhlenberg (1750–1801), member of the Continental Congress, first Speaker of US House of Representatives
Frederick Augustus Muhlenberg (educator) (1818–1901), president of Muhlenberg College
Frederick Augustus Muhlenberg (1887–1980) architect, founder of Muhlenberg Greene Architects, US congressman, and World War I and World War II soldier
Gotthilf Henry Ernest Muhlenberg (1753–1815), botanist
Maria Salome Muhlenberg (1766–1827), youngest daughter of the Rev. Henry Melchior Muhlenberg and wife of US Congressman Matthias Richards (1758-1830); interred at the Charles Evans Cemetery in Reading, Pennsylvania
Henry A. P. Muhlenberg (1782–1844), US congressman and minister to Austria
Francis Swaine Muhlenberg (1795–1831), US congressman
William Augustus Mühlenberg (1796–1877), Episcopal priest, school founder, and philanthropist
Henry Augustus Muhlenberg (1823–1854), US congressman
Frederick Hunter Muhlenberg II (1865–1933), architect
Charles Henry Muhlenberg IV (1870–1960), architect
Charles Henry Muhlenberg V (1899–1985), architect and member of the Reading, Pennsylvania Planning Commission

Hiester family
In addition, the Muhlenbergs were related to the Hiester family. Some notable members were:
John Hiester (1745–1821), US congressman
Daniel Hiester (1747–1804), US congressman
Gabriel Hiester (1749–1824), Pennsylvania political leader
Joseph Hiester (1752–1832), US congressman and governor of Pennsylvania
Daniel Hiester the younger (1774–1834), US congressman
William Hiester (1790–1853), US congressman
William Muhlenberg Hiester (1818–1878), Pennsylvania political leader
Isaac Ellmaker Hiester (1824–1871), US congressman
Hiester Clymer (1827–1884), US congressman

Other descendants

Matthias Richards (1758–1830), US congressman
Henry Melchior Muhlenberg Richards (1848–1935), American military officer
John Andrew Shulze (1775–1852), Governor of Pennsylvania

References

Family tree

 
German-American history
Lutheran families
Political families of the United States
American people of German descent